The 1969 European Baseball Championship was held in Germany and was won by the Netherlands. Italy finished as runner-up.

Standings

References
(NL) European Championship Archive at honkbalsite

European Baseball Championship
European Baseball Championship
1969
1969 in West German sport
1969